The Grand Union Hotel Stakes was an American Thoroughbred horse race run at Saratoga Race Course in Saratoga Springs, New York. A sprint race, it was open to two-year-old horses and run on dirt over a distance of six furlongs.

The Grand Union Hotel Stakes was last run in 1958.

The Grand Union Hotel was a luxury hotel in Saratoga Springs that by 1870 was the largest hotel in the world. It was the meeting place for Saratoga Race Course officials and where the wealthy elite stayed during the racing season.

The Grand Union Hotel Stakes was won by several U.S. Racing Hall of Fame horses including Colin, Man o' War, Zev, Tom Fool, Native Dancer and Nashua. When Man o' War won in 1919, the purse was $10,000.

Partial list of past winners

1958 - First Minister
1957 - Jimmer
1956 - Cohoes
1955 - Career Boy
1954 - Nashua
1953 - Artismo
1952 - Native Dancer
1951 - Tom Fool
1950 - Battle Morn
1949 - Suleiman
1948 - Magic Words
1947 - My Request
1946 - Blue Border
1945 - Manipur
1944 - Pavot
1943 - By Jimminy
1942 - Devil's Thumb
1941 - Shut Out
1940 - New World
1939 - Epatant
1938 - No Competition
1937 - Fighting Fox
1936 - Maedic
1935 - The Fighter
1934 - Chance Sun
1933 - Roustabout
1932 - Ladysman
1931 - Lucky Tom
1930 - Jamestown
1929 - Jim Dandy
1928 - Twink
1927 - Vito
1926 - Kiev
1925 - Haste
1924 - Sunsard
1923 - Big Blaze
1922 - Zev
1921 - Kai-Sang
1920 - Prudery
1919 - Man o' War
1918 - Sweep On
1917 - Sun Briar
1916 - Hourless
1915 - Puss In Boots
1914 - Garbage
1913 - Black Broom
1912 - NYS racing ban
1911 - NYS racing ban
1910 - Iron Mask
1909 - Chickasaw
1908 - Edward
1907 - Colin
1906 - Penarris
1905 - Battleaxe
1904 - Siglight
1903 - Highball
1902 - Grey Friar
1901 - King Hanover
1897 - Archduke
1895 - Hazlet
1892 - One

Notes

References
 The Grand Union Hotel Stakes at Pedigree Query

Discontinued horse races in New York (state)
Flat horse races for two-year-olds
Recurring sporting events established in 1892
Recurring sporting events disestablished in 1952
1892 establishments in New York (state)
1952 disestablishments in New York (state)